Neophytus was a freedman of the Roman emperor Nero. He was one of the four companions on the emperor's late journey in June 68, with Epaphroditus, Phaon and Sporus, and was with him at his death.

Bibliography 
 De Caesaribus, Sextus Aurelius Victor.

1st-century births
1st-century Romans
1st-century deaths
Emperor's slaves and freedmen
Nero